Hugo Denar Salvatierra Saucedo (born 15 January 2003) is a Bolivian professional footballer who plays as a midfielder for Bolivian Primera División club Guabirá.

Career

Club career
Salvatierra is a product of Guabirá. He got his professional debut for the club on 15 December 2019 at the age of 16 against Club Destroyers.

References

External links

2003 births
Living people
Bolivian footballers
Association football midfielders
Club Deportivo Guabirá footballers
Bolivian Primera División players